The 2017 WNBA season was the 21st season for the San Antonio Stars franchise of the WNBA. It was also their 15th and last in San Antonio, as they would move to Las Vegas and become the Aces the following season.

Transactions

WNBA Draft

Trades
 Erika de Souza was acquired from the Chicago Sky. 
 Danielle Robinson was traded to the Phoenix Mercury. 
 Isabelle Harrison was acquired from the Phoenix Mercury, with its 1st round draft pick. 
 Clarissa Dos Santos was acquired from the Chicago Sky, in exchange for Astou Ndour. 
 Jazmon Gwathmey was traded to the Indiana Fever, in exchange for a 2018 3rd round draft pick. 
 Monique Currie was traded to the Phoenix Mercury, in exchange for Shay Murphy, Sophie Brunner, and a 3rd Round Pick in the 2018 WNBA Draft.

Current roster

Game log

Preseason 

|- style="background:#bbffbb;"
| 1
| April 29
| Los Angeles
| L 59–73
| Plum (19)
| 2 Tied (7)
| 2 Tied (5)
| AT&T Center2,834
| 1–0

|- style="background:#fcc;"
| 2
| May 6
| Los Angeles
| L 59–73
| Harrison (22)
| Harrison (5)
| Currie (3)
| Pasadena College1,000
| 1–1

Regular season

|- style="background:#fcc;"
| 1
| May 13
| @ New York
| L 64–73
| Currie (23)
| Montgomery (11)
| Colson (2)
| Madison Square Garden8,207
| 0–1
|- style="background:#fcc;"
| 2
| May 14
| @ Washington
| L 74–89
| Currie (31)
| Currie (6)
| Montgomery (5)
| Capital One Arena6,126
| 0–2
|- style="background:#fcc;"
| 3
| May 19
| Phoenix
| L 72–78
| Harrison (16)
| Montgomery (12)
| Currie (4)
| AT&T Center6,400
| 0–3
|- style="background:#fcc;"
| 4
| May 25
| Dallas
| L 82–94
| McBride (18)
| Harrison (12)
| Currie (4)
| AT&T Center9,621
| 0–5
|- style="background:#fcc;"
| 5
| May 28
| @ Minnesota
| L 66–80
| McBride (18)
| Currie (9)
| Jefferson (8)
| Xcel Energy Center9,034
| 0–5
|- style="background:#fcc;"
| 6
| May 31
| @ Atlanta
| L 70–77
| Currie (14)
| 2 Tied (8)
| Currie (4)
| McCamish Pavilion3,813
| 0–6

|- style="background:#fcc;"
| 7
| June 3
| Connecticut
| L 77–85
| McBride (27)
| Montgomery (7)
| Plum (7)
| AT&T Center7,128
| 0–7
|- style="background:#fcc;"
| 8
| June 6
| Seattle
| L 76–85
| McBride (21)
| Alexander (7)
| 2 Tied (5)
| AT&T Center4,260
| 0–8
|- style="background:#fcc;"
| 9
| June 10
| Chicago
| L 81–85 (OT)
| Jefferson (18)
| Montgomery (7)
| 2 Tied (4)
| AT&T Center  6,191
| 0–9
|- style="background:#fcc;"
| 10
| June 15
| @ Los Angeles
| L 75–80
| Jefferson (24)
| Harrison (8)
| McBride (5)
| Staples Center9,104
| 0–10
|- style="background:#fcc;"
| 11
| June 18
| @ Seattle
| L 57–75
| McBride (11)
| 2 Tied (9)
| 2 Tied (2)
| KeyArena9,686
| 0–11
|- style="background:#fcc;"
| 12
| June 21
| @ Dallas
| L 78–81
| Currie (29)
| Harrison (6)
| Jefferson (6)
| College Park Center4,617
| 0–12
|- style="background:#fcc;"
| 13
| June 23
| Dallas
| L 69–81
| McBride (19)
| 2 Tied (6)
| Currie (6)
| AT&T Center7,086
| 0–13
|- style="background:#fcc;"
| 14
| June 25
| @ Minnesota
| L 78–87
| Jefferson (19)
| Harrison (9)
| Jefferson (8)
| Xcel Energy Center9,013
| 0–14
|- style="background:#bbffbb;"
| 15
| June 30
| Chicago
| W 89–82
| Harrison (19)
| 2 Tied (10)
| Jefferson (8)
| AT&T Center  4,942
| 1–14

|- style="background:#fcc;"
| 16
| July 5
| Connecticut
| L 56–89
| McBride (12)
| 2 Tied (6)
| Colson (3)
| AT&T Center3,210
| 1–15
|- style="background:#fcc;"
| 17
| July 7
| Phoenix
| L 77–92
| McBride (22)
| 2 Tied (5)
| Plum (6)
| AT&T Center8,232
| 1–16
|- style="background:#bbffbb;"
| 18
| July 12
| @ Indiana
| W 79–72
| McBride (18)
| de Souza (7)
| McBride (6)
| Bankers Life Fieldhouse12,282
| 2–16
|- style="background:#fcc;"
| 19
| July 16
| @ Connecticut
| L 75–89
| Harrison (17)
| Hamby (10) 
| Jefferson (3)
| Mohegan Sun Arena6,355
| 2–17
|- style="background:#fcc;"
| 20
| July 18
| @ Atlanta
| L 75–88
| Harrison (22)
| Harrison (9)
| Jefferson (5)
| McCamish Pavilion7,413
| 2–18
|- style="background:#bbffbb;"
| 21
| July 20
| Indiana
| W 85–61
| Harrison (18)
| Harrison (9)
| Jefferson (8)
| AT&T Center7,306
| 3–18
|- style="background:#fcc;"
| 22
| July 25
| Washington
| L 76–85
| 2 Tied (15)
| Montgomery (11)
| 2 Tied (3)
| AT&T Center9,244
| 3–19
|- style="background:#fcc;"
| 23
| July 28
| Los Angeles
| L 73–85
| McBride (20)
| Harrison (6)
| Jefferson (6)
| AT&T Center5,777
| 3–20
|- style="background:#fcc;"
| 24
| July 30
| @ Phoenix
| L 64–81
| Murphy (14)
| Harrison (13)
| McBride (2)
| Talking Stick Resort Arena10,108
| 3–21

|- style="background:#bbffbb;"
| 25
| August 1
| New York
| W 93–81
| McBride (31)
| Harrison (8)
| Jefferson (5)
| AT&T Center3,430
| 4–21
|- style="background:#bbffbb;"
| 26
| August 4
| Washington
| W 76–74
| Harrison (20)
| Harrison (10)
| Plum (12)
| AT&T Center4,955
| 5–21
|- style="background:#bbffbb;"
| 27
| August 5
| Seattle
| W 87–80 (OT)
| Plum (23)
| Harrison (13)
| Montgomery (5)
| AT&T Center5,869
| 6–21
|- style="background:#fcc;"
| 28
| August 10
| @ Chicago
| L 74–94
| Hamby (17) 
| Harrison (9)
| Plum (8)
| Allstate Arena4,686
| 6–22
|- style="background:#bbffbb;"
| 29
| August 12
| Atlanta
| W 84–68
| Harrison (23)
| Hamby (8) 
| Plum (6)
| AT&T Center6,953
| 7–22
|- style="background:#fcc;"
| 30
| August 18
| @ Seattle
| L 78–79
| Hamby (19)
| Harrison (12)
| Plum (5)
| KeyArena9,686
| 7–23
|- style="background:#fcc;"
| 31
| August 22
| @ Los Angeles
| L 55–75
| Montgomery (12)
| Montgomery (7)
| Colson (2)
| Staples Center12,433
| 7–24
|- style="background:#fcc;"
| 32
| August 25
| Minnesota
| L 70–89
| 2 Tied (15)
| Montgomery (10)
| Plum (5)
| AT&T Center7,950
| 7–25

|- style="background:#fcc;"
| 33
| September 1
| @ New York
| L 69–81
| Plum (18)
| Montgomery (10)
| McBride (8)
| Madison Square Garden  10,108
| 7–26
|- style="background:#bbffbb;"
| 34
| September 2
| @ Indiana
| W 75–71
| McBride (28)
| McBride (11)
| McBride (6)
| Bankers Life Fieldhouse  9,420
| 8–26

Standings

References

External links
The Official Site of the San Antonio Stars

San Antonio Stars seasons
San Antonio Stars